Congregation Tifereth Yehuda Veyisroel, also known as the Kerhonkson Synagogue, is a historic synagogue located at Kerhonkson, Ulster County, New York. It was built in 1924, and is a one-story, rectangular, wood-frame building with a gable roof with overhanging eaves.  It sits on a concrete covered stone basement and is clad in stucco on three sides.  The front facade has a false front that extends above the roof with three curves surmounted by a Star of David.  Also on the property is the contributing Community House (c. 1954).  It was built to serve Jewish merchants and farmers in the Kerhonkson area and is one of 20 intact early 20th-century Catskill synagogues.

It was listed on the National Register of Historic Places in 2013.

References

Synagogues in Upstate New York
Synagogues on the National Register of Historic Places in New York (state)
Synagogues completed in 1924
Religious buildings and structures in Ulster County, New York
National Register of Historic Places in Ulster County, New York